Ilok is the easternmost town in Croatia forming a geographic salient surrounded by Vojvodina. Located in the Syrmia region, it lies on a hill overlooking the Danube river, which forms the border with the Bačka region of Serbia. The town is home to a Franciscan monastery and Ilok Castle, which is a popular day trip for domestic tourists.

Name
In Croatian, the town is known as Ilok, in German as Illok, in Hungarian as Újlak, in Serbian Cyrillic as Илок and in Turkish as Uyluk. In Hungarian language "Újlak" means "new dwelling or lodge".

History

The area of present-day Ilok was populated since the neolithic and Bronze Ages. One Scordisci archaeological site dating back to late La Tène culture was excavated in the 1970s and 1980s as a part of rescue excavations in eastern Croatia. The Romans settled there in the 1st or 2nd century and built Cuccium, the first border fortification on the Danube. The Slavs settled here in the 6th century. The area was later ruled by the Bulgarian Empire, with a period of Frankish and Croat rule under Ljudevit Posavski, but after that the Bulgarians return, and stayed there until it was included into the medieval Kingdom of Hungary.

In 12th and 13th centuries the market-town of Ilok was mentioned in documents under various names (Iwnlak, Vilak, Vylok, Wyhok, Wylak). At the end of the 13th century, Hungarian kings gave the Vylak castrum to the powerful Csák noble family. In the 13th and 14th centuries, Ilok was a capital of the semi-independent medieval state of Upper Syrmia ruled by Ugrin Csák.

After 1354, the town of Ilok belonged to Nicholas and Paul Garay (in Croatian references Gorjanski), and then to Nicholas Kont of Orahovica and his descendants, among which was his grandson Ladislaus, great-grandson Nicholas and the last member of the Újlaki (Iločki) family - Lawrence. Nicholas was the Ban of All Slavonia from 1457 to 1463, and his son, Lawrence was a duke of Syrmia from 1477 to 1524.

In 1526, the town came under Ottoman rule. During this time, it was mainly populated by Muslims. In 1566–69, Ilok had 238 Muslim and 27 Christian houses. In 1572, it had 386 Muslim, and 18 Christian houses. In 1669, the population of Ilok numbered 1,160 houses, and town possessed two mosques. It was kaza centre in Sanjak of Syrmia. Habsburg army firstly occupied Ilok in 1688, but Ottomans recaptured it in 1690. In 1697, Habsburg army definitively retook Ilok from the Ottomans and the Muslim population fled.

During the Habsburg rule, Ilok belonged to the Kingdom of Slavonia, a Habsburg province that belonged to both the Kingdom of Croatia, and the Kingdom of Hungary. Between 1849 and 1868, the Kingdom of Slavonia was completely separate Habsburg crownland, and in 1868 it was joined with the Kingdom of Croatia to form the Kingdom of Croatia-Slavonia. In the late 19th and early 20th century, Ilok was a district capital in the Syrmia County of the Kingdom of Croatia-Slavonia.

In 1918, Ilok first became part of the State of Slovenes, Croats and Serbs, and then part of the Kingdom of Serbs, Croats and Slovenes (in 1929 renamed Kingdom of Yugoslavia). From 1929 to 1939, Ilok was part of the Danube Banovina and, from 1939 to 1941, of the Banovina of Croatia within the Kingdom of Yugoslavia. Between 1941 and 1944, during the Axis occupation of Yugoslavia, it belonged to the Independent State of Croatia. From 1945 onward, it was part of the People's Republic of Croatia within Socialist Yugoslavia.

On 17 October 1991 during the beginning of the Croatian War of Independence, non-Serbs fled as the Yugoslav National Army led by Serbs paramilitaries occupied the area, but spared it from destruction due to its rapid surrounding and occupation. Between 1991 and 1995, Ilok was part of the Republic of Serb Krajina. The area was peacefully reintegrated into Croatia in 1998.

Ilok is underdeveloped municipality which is statistically classified as the First Category Area of Special State Concern by the Government of Croatia.

Demographics

According to the 2021 census, the town proper had 3,928 inhabitants, and the whole municipality of Ilok had 5,147. Before the 2001 census, the town was considered part of the old municipality of Vukovar. With pronounced issue of population decline in eastern Croatia caused by population ageing, effects of the Croatian War of Independence and emigration after the accession of Croatia to the European Union, the population of the town and three suburban settlements at the time of 2021 census dropped to 5,045 from 2011 population of 6,767.

Ilok (settlement)

According to the 2011 census, settlement of Ilok had 5,072 inhabitants.

2011 census

1991 census

1910 census

Slovaks in Ilok 

Ilok is one of the centres of the cultural life of the Slovaks of Croatia community. Ilok Slovak community is closely linked with Slovaks in Serbia where there are Slovak communities and Slovak majority villages just across the border and with Slovak language being one of the official languages in Vojvodina.

Once Evangelical Slovaks were granted the right to settle and buy property in the Kingdom of Slavonia in 1859 Slovak settlers across the Danube river in Bačka started to move to Syrmia. Slovak Evangelical Church of the Augsburg Confession established the local parish in Ilok in 1864 with building serving a place of worship, a school and a teacher's apartment. The Slovak Evangelical school, which existed until 1896, was at the time was one of four confessional schools in the town alongside Croat Catholic, Serb Orthodox and the Jewish Israelite school. State sponsored school education in Ilok was reinitiated in 1922 after the establishment of the Kingdom of Serbs, Croats and Slovenes and the public Slovak school will continue its work until 1957. The first Slovak cultural association was established by students of the local gymnasium in 1925 which in the same year joined the Association of Czechoslovak Academicians in Yugoslavia. The Slovak Reading Society was established in 1928 which preserved that name until 1951 when it changed the name into contemporary name the Slovak Cultural and Educational Association Ľudovít Štúr.

Slovak branch of the national Union of Czechs and Slovaks was established in Ilok in 1981 with Slovak cultural life continuing even during the Croatian War of Independence. Following the completion of the United Nations Transitional Administration for Eastern Slavonia, Baranja and Western Sirmium Slovak Cultural and Educational Association Ľudovít Štúr joined the Union of Slovaks in Croatia while local Matica slovenská was established on 18 December 1997. In that period Slovak community used the right to organize Slovak language education for the first four grades until 2002/2003 school year after which only elective Slovak classes were offered. In 2014 local community commemorated 140 years of the existence of the Evangelical-Slovak Church in Ilok.

Gallery

See also
 Church of St. Michael the Archangel, Ilok

References

External links

 
Cities and towns in Croatia
Populated places in Vukovar-Syrmia County
Syrmia County
Populated places on the Danube
Populated places in Syrmia
Slavonia
Croatia–Serbia border crossings